Providencia (Spanish: "providence") is a commune of Chile located in Santiago Province, Santiago Metropolitan Region. Part of Greater Santiago, it is bordered by the communes of Santiago to the west, Recoleta to the northwest, Las Condes and Vitacura to the northeast, La Reina to the east, and Ñuñoa to the south.  It belongs to the Northeastern zone of Santiago de Chile.
Providencia is home to a large upper middle to upper-class population and it holds the region's highest percentage of population over 60 (22%). It contains many high-rise apartment buildings as well as a significant portion of Santiago's commerce. It is notable for its large, old and elegant houses inhabited in the past by the Santiago elite and now mostly used as offices. The municipality is also home to many embassies, including those of Canada, Poland, Hungary, Italy, France, Egypt, Russia, Japan, China, and Uruguay.

Demographics

The population grew by 8.7% (9,692 persons) between the 1992 and 2002 censuses.

Indicators
Area: 14.4 km²
Population: 126,436 (2009 projection)
Average annual household income: US$53,767 (PPP, 2006)
Population below poverty line: 3.5% (2006)
Regional quality of life index: 83.01, high, 5 out of 52 (2005)
Human Development Index: 0.911, 4 out of 341 (2003)

Notable residents
Patricio Aylwin, former president
Ricardo Lagos, former president
Gabriel Valdés, former senator

Administration
As a commune, Providencia is a third-level administrative division of Chile administered by a municipal council, headed by an alcalde who is directly elected every four years. The 2021-2024 alcaldesa is Evelyn Matthei (UDI). The communal council has the following members:

Chile Vamos
 Manuel José Monckeberg (RN)
 Cristofer Brunetti Nuñez (RN)
 Raphael Bergoeing Vela (Evópoli)
 Carolina Plaza Guzmán (UDI)

Other
 Pablo Jaeger Cousiño (PDC)
 Matías Bellolio Merino  (REP)

Apruebo Dignidad
 Tomás Echiburu Altamirano (RD)
 Macarena Fernández Donoso (CS)
 Luis Ibacache Silva (PC)

(Democratic socialism)
 Josefa Errazuriz Guilisasti (Independent)

Providencia belongs to Electoral District No. 10, with Santiago, Ñuñoa, La Granja, Macul and San Joaquín, and to the 7th (Senatorial) District (Santiago Metropolitan Region).
It is represented in the Chamber of Deputies of the National Congress by the deputies Gonzalo Winter (CS), Jorge Alessandri Vergara (UDI), Johannes Kaiser (REP), María Luisa Cordero (IND), Lorena Fries (IND), Helia Molina (PPD), Alejandra Placencia (PC) and Emilia Schneider (COM).

The Directorate General of Civil Aviation has its headquarters in Providencia.

Areas of interest

Providencia includes Barrio Bellavista, a bohemian area populated with artists and performers. The latter lies in the shadow of Cerro San Cristóbal, a prominent hill in the city topped by a 22 m statue of The Virgin Mary. The north of Providencia is its financial and commercial district (centred on Providencia and Nueva Providencia (Ex 11 de Septiembre) avenues), while the remainder of it contains high-priced residential development.

Other notable areas of interest in Providencia include the Metropolitan Zoo, the Teleférico (an aerial gondola) that transports people from the foot of Pedro de Valdivia Norte Street to the top of San Cristóbal Hill), several television networks and Radio Cooperativa.

References

External links

 
  Municipality of Providencia

Geography of Santiago, Chile
Populated places in Santiago Province, Chile
Communes of Chile
Diplomatic districts
Populated places established in 1897
1897 establishments in Chile
Providencia, Chile